The following is a list of notable deaths in February 2020.

Entries for each day are listed alphabetically by surname. A typical entry lists information in the following sequence:
 Name, age, country of citizenship at birth, subsequent country of citizenship (if applicable), reason for notability, cause of death (if known), and reference.

February 2020

1
Viktor Afanasyev, 72, Russian military musician, Senior Director of the Military Band Service of the Armed Forces of Russia (1993–2002).
Péter Andorai, 71, Hungarian actor (My Father's Happy Years, Bizalom, My 20th Century).
Danny Ayres, 33, British speedway rider.
Ilie Bărbulescu, 62, Romanian footballer (Argeș Pitești, Steaua, national team), heart attack.
George Blondheim, 63, Canadian pianist and composer.
Leons Briedis, 70, Latvian poet and author.
John A. DiBiaggio, 87, American academic administrator, President of the University of Connecticut (1970–1985), Michigan State University (1985–1992) and Tufts University (1992–2001). 
Ronald Duman, 65, American psychiatrist.
Lila Garrett, 94, American television writer (Bewitched, Baby, I'm Back).  
Luciano Gaucci, 81, Italian football executive, President of Perugia (1991–2004).
Andy Gill, 64, English post-punk guitarist (Gang of Four) and record producer.
Clarence "Jeep" Jones, 86, American community activist.
Jaswant Singh Kanwal, 100, Indian novelist.
Roger Landry, 86, Canadian businessman and publisher (La Presse).
Lev Mayorov, 50, Russian-Azerbaijani football player and manager (Kuban Barannikovsky, Chernomorets Novorossiysk, national team).
Denford McDonald, 90, New Zealand businessman.
Anthony N. Michel, 84, American electrical engineer.
Luciano Ricceri, 79, Italian production designer (A Special Day, Captain Fracassa's Journey).
Admiral K. Sangma, Indian politician, MLA (1993–2003), heart disease.
Peter Serkin, 72, American classical pianist, Grammy winner (1966), pancreatic cancer.
Howard E. Smither, 94, American musicologist.
Charles Wood, 87, British screenwriter (The Knack ...and How to Get It, Help!, Iris).

2
Peter Aluma, 46, Nigerian basketball player (Liberty Flames, Sacramento Kings).
Senaka Angulugaha, 60, Sri Lankan cricketer (Sri Lanka Air Force Sports Club).
Claire Clouzot, 86, French film director and critic.
Johnny Lee Davenport, 69, American actor (The Fugitive, Joy, Work in Progress), leukemia.
Bernard Ebbers, 78, Canadian communications executive and convicted fraudster, CEO of WorldCom (1985–2002).
Roger Fieldhouse, 79, British historian and academic.
Sir Victor Glover, 87, Mauritian chief judge.
Mad Mike Hoare, 100, British mercenary leader (Congo Crisis, Operation Angela).
Harold H. Izard, 80, American politician, New York State Assemblyman (1975–1976).
Kofi B, Ghanaian highlife musician, heart attack.
Ivan Král, 71, Czech-American musician and songwriter ("Ask the Angels", "Pumping (My Heart)", "Dancing Barefoot").
David Lacy-Scott, 99, English cricketer (Cambridge University, Kent).
Enemésio Ângelo Lazzaris, 71, Brazilian Roman Catholic prelate, bishop of Balsas (since 2008).
Philip Leder, 85, American geneticist.
Mike Moore, 71, New Zealand politician, Prime Minister (1990), Director-General of the World Trade Organization (1999–2002), Ambassador to the United States (2010–2015).
Ryszard Olszewski, 87, Polish Olympic basketball player (1960) and coach, and politician.
Lovelady Powell, 89, American actress (I Never Sang for My Father, The Possession of Joel Delaney, The Happy Hooker).
Kommareddy Surender Reddy, Indian politician, MLA (1985–1989).
M. Narayana Reddy, 88, Indian politician, MP (1967–1971), MLA (1972–1978).
Harry Rubin, 93, American cell biologist and virologist.
Gale Schisler, 86, American politician, member of the U.S. (1965–1967) and Illinois (1969–1981) Houses of Representatives.
Robert Sheldon, Baron Sheldon, 96, British politician, MP (1964–2001) and member of the House of Lords (2001–2015), heart attack.
Rabi Singh, 89, Indian Odia poet.
Salahuddin Wahid, 77, Indonesian politician and Islamic scholar, member of the People's Consultative Assembly (1998–1999), complications from heart surgery.
Valentin Yanin, 90, Russian historian.

3
Philippe Adamov, 63, French cartoonist.
Robert Alner, 76, British racehorse trainer.
Deborah Batts, 72, American jurist, Judge of the U.S. District Court for Southern New York (since 1994).
John Edward Brockelbank, 88, Canadian politician, member of the Legislative Assembly of Saskatchewan (1964–1982, 1986–1991).
Jacques Delelienne, 91, Belgian Olympic athlete (1952).
Morris Foster, 83, Irish Olympic racing cyclist (1968).
Donald S. Gann, 87, American trauma surgeon.
Pranab Kumar Gogoi, 83, Indian politician, MLA (since 2001).
John Grant, 70, Scottish science fiction writer.
*Hsueh Shou Sheng, 93, Chinese-Canadian academic.
Durul Huda, 64, Bangladeshi politician, MP (1988–1990), mayor of Rajshahi City Corporation (1990).
David Kessler, 60, French senior official (Conseil supérieur de l'audiovisuel, Centre national du cinéma et de l'image animée).
Douglas Knapp, 70, American cinematographer and camera operator (Assault on Precinct 13, Star Trek: Voyager).
William John McNaughton, 93, American-born Roman Catholic prelate, Bishop of Incheon (1961–2002).
Eric Parkin, 95, English pianist.
Vilen Prokofyev, 18, Kazakh ice hockey player (Snezhnye Barsy Astana), Ewing's sarcoma.
Gene Reynolds, 96, American actor (Gallant Sons) and television producer (M*A*S*H, Lou Grant), heart failure.
Frank H. T. Rhodes, 93, British-American academic, president of Cornell University (1977–1995).
Josefa Rika, 32, Fijian cricketer (national team).
Aurel Șelaru, 84, Romanian Olympic racing cyclist (1960).
Valentyna Shevchenko, 84, Ukrainian politician, chairperson of the Presidium of the Supreme Soviet of the Ukrainian Soviet Socialist Republic (1985–1990).
George Steiner, 90, French-American literary critic and essayist (After Babel).
Jana Vápenková, 72, Czech Olympic volleyball player (1972).
Roy Walton, 87, English card magician.
Eugen V. Witkowsky, 69, Russian fantasy writer.
Willie Wood, 83, American Hall of Fame football player (Green Bay Packers).

4
Giancarlo Bergamini, 93, Italian fencer, Olympic gold medalist (1956).
Claudio Bonadio, 64, Argentine federal judge (Notebook scandal, AMIA bombing), brain tumor.
Kamau Brathwaite, 89, Barbadian poet and academic.
Bill Britten, 91, American actor (Bozo the Clown).
Andrew Brough, 56, New Zealand musician and songwriter (Straitjacket Fits).
Gil Coan, 97, American baseball player (Washington Senators, Baltimore Orioles, New York Giants).
José Luis Cuerda, 72, Spanish film director (Butterfly's Tongue, Amanece, que no es poco), producer (The Others) and screenwriter, Goya winner (1987, 1988, 2000, 2009).
Jean Faggion, 88, French Olympic pistol shooter (1972, 1976).
Marie-Fanny Gournay, 93, French politician.
Abadi Hadis, 22, Ethiopian Olympic long-distance runner (2016).
Tibor Halgas, 38, Hungarian footballer (Diósgyőri VTK, BKV Előre SC), traffic collision.
Terry Hands, 79, British theatre director (Royal Shakespeare Company).
Peter Hogg, 80, New Zealand-born Canadian lawyer and legal scholar.
Volodymyr Inozemtsev, 55, Ukrainian triple jumper.
Laurie Johnson, 92, Barbadian cricketer (Derbyshire).
Volker David Kirchner, 77, German violist and composer.
Dick Koecher, 93, American baseball player (Philadelphia Phillies).
Romualdas Lankauskas, 87, Lithuanian writer and playwright.
Nadia Lutfi, 83, Egyptian actress (The Night of Counting the Years, Saladin the Victorious).
Bonnie MacLean, 80, American psychedelic poster artist.
Asiwaju Yinka Mafe, 46, Nigerian politician.
Donatien Mavoungou, 72, Gabonese physician and fraudster.
Alice Mayhew, 87, American book editor and publisher (Simon & Schuster).
L. Jacques Ménard, 74, Canadian businessman, Chancellor of Concordia University (2012–2014).
Jane Milmore, 64, American playwright, television writer and producer (Martin, Newhart, The Hughleys), pancreatic cancer.
Zwy Milshtein, 85, Romanian-born French painter.
Gianni Minervini, 91, Italian film producer (Berlinguer, I Love You, Where's Picone?, Marrakech Express), Nastro d'Argento winner (1984).
Daniel arap Moi, 95, Kenyan politician, MP (1963–2004), Vice President (1967–1978) and  President (1978–2002), multiple organ failure.
Nguyễn Văn Chiếu, 70, Vietnamese martial artist, master of Vovinam.
William Oxley, 80, English poet and philosopher.
Ljiljana Petrović, 81, Serbian singer ("Neke davne zvezde").
Eugen Pleško, 71, Croatian Olympic cyclist (1972).
Frank Plummer, 67, Canadian microbiologist (rVSV-ZEBOV vaccine).
Benito Sarti, 83, Italian footballer (Sampdoria, Juventus, national team).
Teodor Shanin, 89, Lithuanian-born British sociologist.
Alexander Skvortsov, 65, Russian ice hockey player, Olympic champion (1984).
Fernando Suarez, 52, Filipino Roman Catholic priest, heart attack.

5
Aidar Akayev, 43, Kyrgyz politician, President of the National Olympic Committee (2004–2005), cardiac arrest.
Edwin Barbosa, 51, Brazilian percussionist.
Carlos Barisio, 69, Argentine footballer (Gimnasia, All Boys, Ferro Carril Oeste), lung cancer.
Eamonn Boyce, 94, Irish IRA volunteer.
Buddy Cage, 73, American pedal steel guitarist (New Riders of the Purple Sage, Great Speckled Bird), multiple myeloma.
Diane Cailhier, 73, Canadian filmmaker and director.
Stanley Cohen, 97, American biochemist, Nobel Prize laureate (1986).
Kevin Conway, 77, American actor (Gettysburg, Thirteen Days, Oz), heart attack.
Ian Cushenan, 86, Canadian ice hockey player (Montreal Canadiens, Chicago Blackhawks), Stanley Cup champion (1959).
Gyurme Dorje, 69, Scottish Buddhist philosopher.
Kirk Douglas, 103, American actor (Spartacus, Paths of Glory, Seven Days in May), Honorary Oscar winner (1996).
F. X. Feeney, 66, American screenwriter (Frankenstein Unbound, The Big Brass Ring), film director and film critic.
James Leo Garrett Jr., 94, American theologian.
Naadodigal Gopal, 54, Indian actor and comedian, heart attack.
Irwin Kremen, 94, American artist.
Beverly Pepper, 97, American sculptor.
Lawrence W. Pierce, 95, American jurist, Judge of the U.S. District Court for Southern New York (1971–1981) and Court of Appeals for the Second Circuit (1981–1995).
Dmitry Ponomarev, 67, Russian entrepreneur.
Yves Pouliquen, 88, French ophthalmologist, member of the Académie française (since 2001).
Mohammad Shafiq, Pakistani politician, MLA (since 2015), cardiac arrest.
Rajendra Prakash Singh, 75, Indian politician, MLA (1990–1998), cancer.
John C. Whitcomb, 95, American theologian and author (The Genesis Flood).

6
Dick Atha, 88, American basketball player (New York Knicks, Detroit Pistons).
Cyril Bardsley, 88, English track cyclist.
Francie Brolly, 82, Irish politician, MLA (2003–2010).
Rush Brown, 65, American football player (St. Louis Cardinals).
Raphaël Coleman, 25, British actor (Nanny McPhee, It's Alive, The Fourth Kind), heart failure.
Greg Hawick, 87, Australian rugby league football player (South Sydney Rabbitohs, national team) and coach (North Sydney Bears).
Gioacchino Illiano, 84, Italian Roman Catholic prelate, bishop of Nocera Inferiore-Sarno (1987–2011).
Roger Kahn, 92, American author (The Boys of Summer).
Earl Kemp, 90, American publisher and editor, fall.
Malik Ata Muhammad Khan, 78, Pakistani feudal lord and politician.
Bruno Léchevin, 68, French trade unionist (Électricité de France).
Jan Liberda, 83, Polish football player (Polonia Bytom, AZ, national team) and manager.
Ola Magnell, 74, Swedish musician, heart failure.
Miss Shefali, 76, Indian actress (Pratidwandi), kidney disease.<ref>[https://www.outlookindia.com/newsscroll/kolkatas-queen-of-cabaret-miss-shefali-no-more/1727509 Kolkatas Queen of Cabaret Miss Shefali no more]</ref>
André Neles, 42, Brazilian-Equatorial Guinean footballer (Botafogo Futebol Clube, São Carlos, Equatorial Guinea national team), heart attack.
Qiu Jun, 72, Chinese bodybuilder, COVID-19.
Bommireddy Sundara Rami Reddy, 84, Indian politician, MLA (1978–1983, 1985–1994).
Peter Rockwell, 83, American sculptor.
Charles Royster, 75, American historian.
Nello Santi, 88, Italian conductor.
J. B. Sumarlin, 87, Indonesian economist and politician, Minister of Finance (1988–1993).
Krishna Baldev Vaid, 92, Indian writer.
Jhon Jairo Velásquez, 57, Colombian hitman, drug dealer and extortionist (Medellín Cartel), esophageal cancer.
Wang Jin, 93, Chinese archaeologist, thoracic spinal tuberculosis.

7
Mohammad S. Abdeli, Saudi Arabian footballer.
Sir Leonard Appleyard, 81, British diplomat, Ambassador to China (1994–1997).
Mykolas Arlauskas, 89, Lithuanian agronomist, signatory of the Act of March 11.
Orson Bean, 91, American actor (Dr. Quinn, Medicine Woman, Being John Malkovich) and game show panelist (To Tell the Truth), traffic collision.
Raju Bharatan, 86, Indian cricket journalist.
Ron Calhoun, 86, Canadian non-profit executive (Canadian Cancer Society, Marathon of Hope).
Ronny Drayton, 66, American guitarist.
Angel Echevarria, 48, American baseball player (Colorado Rockies, Milwaukee Brewers, Chicago Cubs), fall.
Lucille Eichengreen, 95, German Holocaust survivor and memoirist.
Lenin El-Ramly, 74, Egyptian screenwriter (The Terrorist).
Brian Glennie, 73, Canadian ice hockey player  (Toronto Maple Leafs, Los Angeles Kings), Olympic bronze medallist  (1968).
James George, 101, Canadian diplomat.
Mary Griffith, 85, American LGBT rights activist.
Pierre Guyotat, 80, French novelist.
Hong Ling, 53, Chinese geneticist and professor, COVID-19.
Marilyn Jenkins, 85, American baseball player (Grand Rapids Chicks).
Paul Koralek, 86, Austrian-born British architect.
Bal Kudtarkar, 98, Indian radio personality.
Jørgen E. Larsen, 74, Danish football player (Herfølge) and manager (Ghana national team, Qatar national team).
Li Wenliang, 33, Chinese ophthalmologist and whistleblower, COVID-19.
James McGarrell, 89, American painter.
Nexhmije Pagarusha, 86, Albanian singer and actress.
Brian Pilkington, 86, English footballer (Burnley, Bolton Wanderers, Barrow).
Larry Popein, 89, Canadian ice hockey player (New York Rangers, Oakland Seals) and coach (Omaha Knights).
Pablo Rosenkjer, 89, Argentine Olympic alpine skier (1948, 1952).
Go Soo-jung, 24, South Korean actress and model.
Harold Strachan, 94, South African writer and anti-apartheid activist.
Ann E. Todd, 88, American actress.
Wichie Torres, 67, Puerto Rican painter, cardiovascular disease.
Grazia Volpi, 78, Italian film producer (Caesar Must Die, Fiorile).
Steve Weber, 76, American folk singer, songwriter and guitarist (The Holy Modal Rounders, The Fugs).

8
Paddy Broderick, 80, Irish jockey.
Michael Bushby, 88, English cricketer (Cambridge University Cricket Club).
Robert Conrad, 84, American actor (Hawaiian Eye, The Wild Wild West, Baa Baa Black Sheep), heart failure.
Jacques Cuinières, 77, French photographer.
Maurice Girardot, 98, French basketball player, Olympic silver medalist (1948).
Aleksandr Titovich Golubev, 83, Russian intelligence officer (KGB, Foreign Intelligence Service).
Victor Gorelick, 78, American comic book editor (Archie Comics).
Mariano Gottifredi, 89, Italian Olympic rower (1968, 1972).
Paula Kelly, 77, American actress (Night Court, Santa Barbara, Soylent Green) and dancer, chronic obstructive pulmonary disease.
Erazim Kohák, 86, Czech philosopher and writer.
Lew Mander, 80, New Zealand-born Australian organic chemist.
Robert Massin, 94, French graphic designer, cerebral hemorrhage.
Dave McCoy, 104, American businessman, founder of the Mammoth Mountain Ski Area.
Ron McLarty, 72, American author, narrator and actor (Spenser: For Hire, Courage the Cowardly Dog, Champs).
Bhagwat Patel, 84, Indian politician, MLA (1990–1993).
Bill Robinson, 71, Canadian Olympic basketball player (1976).
Carlos Rojas Vila, 91, Spanish author.
Sankar Sen, 92, Indian academic and politician, vice chancellor of Jadavpur University, MLA (1991–2001).
Keelin Shanley, 51, Irish journalist and newscaster (RTÉ News: Six One), cancer.
Volker Spengler, 80, German actor (In a Year of 13 Moons, The Third Generation, The Marriage of Maria Braun).
Yi Hae-won, 100, South Korean princess, head of the House of Yi (since 2005).

9
Terry Bamford, 77, British social worker.
Goldie Brangman-Dumpson, 102, American nurse.
Sir John Cadogan, 89, British organic chemist.
Don Coleman, 87, American high school basketball coach.
Délizia, 67, Belgian singer.
Abdel Aziz El Mubarak, 69, Sudanese singer, pneumonia.
Marvin P. Feinsmith, 87, American bassoonist.
Richard J. Fox, 92, American real estate developer.
Mirella Freni, 84, Italian operatic soprano.
David Gistau, 49, Spanish TV writer and novelist, brain injury.
Margareta Hallin, 88, Swedish operatic soprano.
Sorrel Hays, 79, American pianist and composer.
Giriraj Kishore, 82, Indian writer, heart attack.
Delores J. Knaak, 90, American educator and politician, member of the Minnesota Senate (1977–1980).
Enrique Marin, 84, Spanish-born French painter and sculptor.
Peter McCall, 83, English footballer (Bristol City, Oldham Athletic).
P. Parameswaran, 91, Indian historian and political activist (Rashtriya Swayamsevak Sangh).
Carlos Julio Pereyra, 97, Uruguayan politician, Senator (1966–2005), kidney failure.
Karl-Heinz Rädler, 84, German astrophysicist.
K. Jayachandra Reddy, 90, Indian jurist, Judge of the Supreme Court (1979–1980) and Chairman of the Press Council (2001–2005).
Donald Russell, 99, British classicist and academic.
Sergei Slonimsky, 87, Russian composer (The Republic of ShKID, The Mysterious Wall, Summer Impressions of Planet Z), pianist and musicologist.
Alvin V. Tollestrup, 95, American physicist.
Sergiy Vilkomir, 63, Ukrainian-born American computer scientist.

10
Saïd Amara, 75, Tunisian handball player and coach (Espérance Sportive de Tunis, national team).
Efigenio Ameijeiras, 88, Cuban revolutionary and military commander (Bay of Pigs Invasion), sepsis.
Álvaro Barreto, 84, Portuguese politician.
Claire Bretécher, 79, French cartoonist, co-founder of L'Écho des savanes.
Diana Garrigosa, 75, Spanish teacher and activist (Pasqual Maragall Foundation).
Mario Ghella, 90, Italian Olympic cyclist.
Waqar Hasan, 87, Pakistani cricketer (national team).
Robert Hermann, 88, American mathematician, pneumonia.
Raymon Lacy, 97, American baseball player (Homestead Grays, Houston Eagles).
Lin Zhengbin, 62, Chinese physician and organ transplant expert, COVID-19.
Ignatius Datong Longjan, 75, Nigerian politician, Senator (since 2019).
Ailsa Maxwell, 97, Scottish codebreaker and historian.
Lyle Mays, 66, American jazz pianist and composer (Pat Metheny Group).
Marge Redmond, 95, American actress (The Flying Nun, The Fortune Cookie, Family Plot). 
Dick Scott, 86, American baseball player (Los Angeles Dodgers, Chicago Cubs).
Rubén Selman, 56, Chilean football referee, heart attack.
Shariff Abdul Samat, 36, Singaporean footballer (Tampines Rovers, Hougang United, national team).
John Smith, 83, Australian cricketer (Victoria).
Pavel Vilikovský, 78, Slovak writer.
Hussein M. Zbib, 61, Lebanese-born American engineer.

11
François André, 52, French politician, Deputy (since 2012), lung cancer.
Maurice Byblow, 73, Canadian politician.
Bob Cashell, 81, American politician, Lieutenant Governor of Nevada (1983–1987) and mayor of Reno (2002–2014).
George Coyne, 87, American Roman Catholic priest and astronomer, director of the Vatican Observatory (1978–2006), cancer.
Jim Cullinan, 77, Irish hurler (Newmarket-on-Fergus).
Paul English, 87, American drummer (Willie Nelson), pneumonia.
Jean-Pierre Gallet, 76, Belgian journalist (RTBF).
Jamie Gilson, 86, American author.
Raj Kumar Gupta, 85, Indian politician, MLA (2002–2007).
Ron Haddrick, 90, Australian cricketer and actor (The Stranger, Dot and Santa Claus, Quigley Down Under).
Louis-Edmond Hamelin, 96, Canadian geographer.
Yasumasa Kanada, 70, Japanese mathematician, myocardial ischemia.
Jack Kramer, 80, Norwegian footballer (Vålerenga, national team).
Jane Lokan, 98, American politician, member of the Oregon House of Representatives (1995–2001).
Anne Windfohr Marion, 81, American heiress and art patron, co-founder of Georgia O'Keeffe Museum.
Sammy McCarthy, 88, British boxer.
Jacques Mehler, 83, French cognitive psychologist.
Katsuya Nomura, 84, Japanese Hall of Fame baseball player (Nankai Hawks) and manager (Yakult Swallows).
Timothy Porteous, 86, Canadian administrator.
Ramjit Raghav, 104, Indian wrestler and farmer, world's oldest father, house fire.
Valery Reinhold, 77, Russian footballer (Spartak Moscow).
Marcelino dos Santos, 90, Mozambican poet and politician, Vice President of FRELIMO (1970–1977) and President of the Assembly of the Republic (1977–1994).
Joseph Shabalala, 79, South African musician (Ladysmith Black Mambazo).
Betty Siegel, 89, American academic, president of Kennesaw State University (1981–2006).
David Stout, 77, American writer.
Ferdinand Ulrich, 88, German Catholic philosopher.
Jim Janssen van Raaij, 77, Dutch politician, MEP (1979–1984, 1986–1999).
Joseph Vilsmaier, 81, German film director (Stalingrad, Brother of Sleep, Comedian Harmonists).

12
Javier Arévalo, 82, Mexican artist, heart failure.
Whitlow Au, 79, American bioacoustics specialist.
Jeanne Beaman, 100, American choreographer.
Benon Biraaro, 61, Ugandan military officer, colon cancer.
Christie Blatchford, 68, Canadian journalist (The Globe and Mail, National Post, Toronto Sun), lung cancer.
Hubert Boulard, 49, French comic book author.
Miguel Cordero del Campillo, 95, Spanish veterinarian and parasitologist, Senator (1977–1979), rector of the University of León (1984–1986).
Simone Créantor, 71, French athlete.
Takis Evdokas, 91, Cypriot politician and psychiatrist, founder of the Democratic National Party.
Geert Hofstede, 91, Dutch social psychologist.
Charles Hubbard, 79, Canadian politician.
Frederick R. Koch, 86, American collector and philanthropist.
Mike Lilly, 70, American banjo player and singer, leukemia.
Hansjoachim Linde, 93, German inspector general.
Hamish Milne, 80, English pianist.
Nikolai Moskvitelev, 93, Russian military officer (Soviet Naval Aviation, Soviet Air Defence Forces).
Victor Olaiya, 89, Nigerian highlife trumpeter.
Christopher Pole-Carew, 88, British newspaper editor (Nottingham Evening Post) and High Sheriff of Nottinghamshire (1979).
Wendell Rodricks, 59, Indian fashion designer.
Mahima Silwal, Nepali actress, traffic collision.
Søren Spanning, 68, Danish actor (Jul i Valhal, Headhunter, A Royal Affair).
T. Tali, 77, Indian politician, MLA (1977–1982, 1987–1989, 1993–2008).
Nikitas Venizelos, 89, Greek businessman (Venizelos SA) and politician, MP (1974–1981, 1993–1996) and Deputy Speaker (1993–1996).
Cheryl Wheeler-Dixon, 59, American stuntwoman (Back to the Future Part II, Thor, They Live), shot.
Tamás Wichmann, 72, Hungarian sprint canoeist, Olympic silver (1968, 1972) and bronze medalist (1976).
Joe Zbacnik, 82, American curler.

13
Ronne Arnold, 81–82, American-born Australian dancer, dance teacher, choreographer and actor.
Sir Michael Berridge, 81, Southern Rhodesian-born British biochemist.
Aleksey Botyan, 103, Soviet-Armenian spy and intelligence officer.
Sir Des Britten, 82, New Zealand television chef, restaurateur and Anglican priest, cancer.
Henry T. Brown, 87, American chemical engineer.
Ecomet Burley, 65, American football player (Toronto Argonauts, Winnipeg Blue Bombers, Hamilton Tiger-Cats).
Valeri Butenko, 78, Russian football referee (1986 FIFA World Cup).
Renzo Chiocchetti, 74, Italian Olympic cross-country skier (1972, 1976).
Christophe Desjardins, 57, French violist.
Franco Del Prete, 76, Italian musician (Napoli Centrale).
Tatiana Fabergé, 89, French CERN secretary.
Clifford B. Janey, 73, American school superintendent.
Herman Kahan, 93, Romanian-born Norwegian businessman and Holocaust survivor.
Liliane de Kermadec, 92, French film director and screenwriter. 
Ai Kidosaki, 94, Japanese author and chef, heart failure.
David Lane, 92, American politician, Massachusetts state representative (1973–1978).
Carlo de Leeuw, 59, Dutch footballer (Feyenoord, SC Cambuur), tongue cancer.
Michel Lequenne, 98, French politician and writer.
Buzzy Linhart, 76, American folk-rock singer and songwriter.
Liu Shouxiang, 61, Chinese watercolour painter, COVID-19.
Ryan McDonald, 89, American actor (Days of Our Lives, The Odd Couple, Falcon Crest).
Charles James McDonnell, 88, American Roman Catholic bishop.
Ralph Mercier, 83, Canadian politician, mayor of Charlesbourg (1984–2001).
Karel Neffe, 71, Czech rower, Olympic bronze medalist (1972).
Rajendra K. Pachauri, 79, Indian economist and engineer, Chairman of the Intergovernmental Panel on Climate Change (2002–2015).
Daniel M. Pierce, 91, American politician, member of the Illinois House of Representatives (1965–1985).
Charles H. Pitman, 84, American lieutenant general, cancer.
Malcolm Pyke, 81, English footballer (West Ham United, Crystal Palace, Dartford).
Rafael Romero Marchent, 93, Spanish film director (Dead Men Don't Count, Sartana Kills Them All), actor (Mare Nostrum) and screenwriter.
Yoshisada Sakaguchi, 80, Japanese voice actor (Reign: The Conqueror, Jin-Roh: The Wolf Brigade, Appleseed), colorectal cancer.
Imtilemba Sangtam, 74, Indian politician, MLA (2003–2008, 2013–2018).
Chuck Shelton, 84, American football player (Pittsburg State) and coach (Drake Bulldogs, Utah State Aggies).
Zara Steiner, 91, American-born British historian and academic.
Marie Stiborová, 70, Czech politician.
Taty Sumirah, 68, Indonesian badminton player, 1975 Uber Cup winner, lung disease.
Jimmy Thunder, 54, Samoan-born New Zealand heavyweight boxer, Commonwealth Games champion (1986), complications from brain surgery.

14
Graham Adams, 86, English-born Canadian football player (Plymouth Argyle) and manager.
Peter Iornzuul Adoboh, 61, Nigerian Roman Catholic prelate, bishop of Katsina-Ala (since 2013).
Syed Imtiaz Ahmed, 65, Indian cricketer (Karnataka).
Abdul Hafeez Khan Al Yousefi, 82, Pakistani-born Emirati agronomist, leukemia.
Gilbert Belin, 92, French politician and sculptor, Senator (1974–1983) and mayor of Brassac-les-Mines (1971–2001).
Alwin Brück, 88, German politician.
Malhotra Chamanlal, 84, Indian cricketer.
Christophoros, 88, Greek Orthodox prelate.
Ivo Cocconi, 90, Italian footballer (Parma).
Lynn Cohen, 86, American actress (Sex and the City, Munich, The Hunger Games: Catching Fire).
Jimmy Conway, 73, Irish footballer (Fulham, Portland Timbers, national team).
Robert H. Dyson, 92, American archaeologist.
Garrett Fitzgerald, 65, Irish rugby union player and coach.
Brian Jackson, 86, English footballer (Liverpool, Peterborough United).
Kenneth Keniston, 90, American social psychologist.
Adama Kouyaté, 92, Malian photographer.
Reinbert de Leeuw, 81, Dutch conductor, composer and pianist.
Matvey Natanzon, 47, Russian-born Israeli backgammon player.
Godfrey O'Donnell, 80, Northern Irish priest, president of the Irish Council of Churches (2012–2014).
K. P. Rajendra Prasad, Indian politician, MLA (2001–2006), cancer.
Decebal Traian Remeș, 70, Romanian economist and politician, Minister of Finance (1998–2000).
Michel Ragon, 95, French art historian and critic.
Esther Scott, 66, American actress (Boyz n the Hood, Dreamgirls, Hart of Dixie), heart attack.
Sonam Sherpa, 48, Indian guitarist (Parikrama), cardiac arrest.
John Shrapnel, 77, English actor (Gladiator, Troy, 101 Dalmatians), lung cancer.
Abdus Sobhan, 83, Bangladeshi politician and convicted war criminal, MP (1991–1995, 2001–2006).
Sun Ruyong, 92, Chinese ecologist, heart attack.
Thrinimong Sangtam, 87, Indian politician, MLA (1987–1989).
Masao Takahashi, 90, Canadian judoka.
Clayton Williams, 88, American businessman and politician, pneumonia.

15
Shahnaz Ansari, 50, Pakistani politician, MPA (since 2013), shot.
Mykola Bondar, 29, Ukrainian figure skater. 
David Clewell, 65, American poet, Poet Laureate of Missouri (2010–2012).
Louis A. Craco, 86, American lawyer.
Virgil C. Dechant, 89, American Roman Catholic fraternity leader, Supreme Knight of the Knights of Columbus (1977–2000).
Duan Zhengcheng, 85, Chinese engineer, COVID-19.
Tony Fernández, 57, Dominican baseball player (Toronto Blue Jays, San Diego Padres, Cleveland Indians), complications from kidney disease and stroke.
Caroline Flack, 40, English television and radio presenter (The X Factor, Love Island, I'm a Celebrity: Extra Camp), suicide by hanging.
Jamey Gambrell, 65, American translator, cancer.
Naeemul Haque, 70, Pakistani political advisor, blood cancer.
Amie Harwick, 38, American therapist, homicide.
Rudy Hayes, 85, American football player (Pittsburgh Steelers).
A. E. Hotchner, 102, American editor and novelist, co-founder of Newman's Own.
Noor Hussain, 90, Bangladeshi politician, MP (1986–1988).
Simon Kagugube, 65, Ugandan lawyer and corporate executive, heart failure.
A. K. M. Jahangir Khan, 80, Bangladeshi film producer (Nayanmani, Chandranath, Shuvoda).
Éric Laforge, 56, French radio show host.
Vatroslav Mimica, 96, Croatian film director (The Jubilee of Mr Ikel, Prometheus of the Island, Anno Domini 1573) and screenwriter.
Prince Kudakwashe Musarurwa, 31, Zimbabwean singer-songwriter, lung cancer.
Ahmed Abdel Rahman Nasser, 85, Egyptian air marshal.
Hilmi Ok, 88, Turkish football referee (UEFA Euro 1980).
Lavy Pinto, 90, Indian Olympic sprinter (1952).
Dennis Remmert, 81, American football player (Buffalo Bills).
Donald Stratton, 97, American naval seaman and memoirist (USS Arizona).
David Sturtevant Ruder, 90, American jurist and academic.
Karl Ludwig Schweisfurth, 89, German businessman.
Sheu Yu-jer, 67, Taiwanese economist and politician, Minister of Finance (2016–2018).
Wilfried Thaler, 85, Austrian cyclist.
Ron Thompson, 66, American blues guitarist (John Lee Hooker).
Léon Wurmser, 89, Swiss psychoanalyst.
José Zalaquett, 77, Chilean lawyer and civil rights activist.

16
Henry Akin, 75, American basketball player (New York Knicks, Seattle SuperSonics, Kentucky Colonels).
Duane Alexander, 79, American physician (NICHD), complications from Alzheimer's disease.
Md. Rahamat Ali, 74, Bangladeshi politician, Minister of Local Government, Rural Development and Co-operatives (1999–2001), MP (1991–1995, 1996–2006, 2008–2018).
Graeme Allwright, 93, New Zealand-born French singer-songwriter.
Joan Armengol, 97, Andorran politician, Mayor of Andorra la Vella (1970–1971).
Didier Cabestany, 50, French rugby league footballer.
Zoe Caldwell, 86, Australian actress (Master Class, Lilo & Stitch, Extremely Loud & Incredibly Close), 4-time Tony winner, complications from Parkinson's disease.
Pearl Carr, 98, English singer (Pearl Carr & Teddy Johnson).
Habul Chakraborty, 60, Indian politician, MLA (2011–2016).
John Cockett, 92, English field hockey player, Olympic bronze medallist (1952).
Frances Cuka, 83, British actress (Scrooge, The Watcher in the Woods, Snow White: A Tale of Terror).
Clyde Davenport, 98, American old-time fiddler and banjo player.
Jason Davis, 35, American actor (Recess, Beverly Hills Ninja, Mafia!), fentanyl overdose.
Andrew Fairfield, 76, American bishop.
Harry Gregg, 87, Northern Irish footballer (Manchester United), Munich air disaster survivor.
Loek Hollander, 81, Dutch karate master.
Barry Hulshoff, 73, Dutch football player (Ajax, national team) and manager (Lierse).
John Iliffe, 88, British computer designer.
Theodore Johnson, 95, American Tuskegee Airman.
Robert B. Jordan, 87, American politician, Lieutenant Governor of North Carolina (1985–1989), member of the North Carolina Senate (1977–1985).
Arun Kumar Kar, 81, Indian politician, MLA (1988–1993), cardiac arrest.
Corinne Lahaye, 72, French actress (Now Where Did the 7th Company Get to?, Le Bourgeois gentilhomme).
Katharine Kyes Leab, 78, American publisher.
Erickson Le Zulu, 41, Ivorian disc jockey, cirrhosis.
John Liebenberg, 61, South African photojournalist, complications from surgery.
Dawn Mello, 88, American fashion executive (Bergdorf Goodman).
Mack Miller, 87, American Olympic cross-country skier (1956, 1960).
Ed Murphy, 78, American college basketball coach (Ole Miss Rebels).
Kellye Nakahara, 72, American actress (M*A*S*H, Clue, 3 Ninjas Kick Back) and artist, cancer.
André Patey, 78, French Olympic bobsledder.
Agarala Eswara Reddi, 86, Indian politician, MLA (1967–1972, 1978–1983).
M. Shamsur Rahman, 80, Bangladeshi academic, vice-chancellor of Jatiya Kabi Kazi Nazrul Islam University (2006–2009).
Heinz Schaufelberger, 72, Swiss chess FIDE Master.
Barbara Steveni, 91, British conceptual artist.
Glenn E. Summers, 94, American politician, member of the Florida House of Representatives (1947–1951).
Larry Tesler, 74, American computer scientist (Apple Inc., Xerox), designer of cut, copy, and paste.
Mátyás Tímár, 96, Hungarian economist and politician, Minister of Finance (1962–1967) and Governor of the National Bank (1975–1988). (death announced on this date)

17
Chaudhary Khurshid Ahmed, 85, Indian politician, MLA (1962–1967, 1968–1972, 1977–1982, 1987–1988, 1996–2000), MP (1988–1989).
Per Andersen, 90, Norwegian neuroscientist.
Owen Bieber, 90, American labor union executive, president of the United Automobile Workers (1983–1995).
Jens Bjerre, 98, Danish adventurer and filmmaker.
Jean Clausse, 83, French runner (1959 Mediterranean Games, 1962 European Athletics Championships).
Ja'Net DuBois, 87, American actress (Good Times, The PJs) and singer (The Jeffersons theme), cardiac arrest.
Henry Gray, 95, American Hall of Fame blues pianist and singer.
Pandhari Juker, Indian make-up artist.
Lorenzo León Alvarado, 91, Peruvian Roman Catholic prelate, bishop of Huacho (1967–2003).
Jimmy Lester, 88, American politician.
Greg Lewis, 66, American politician, member of the Kansas House of Representatives (2015–2019), glioblastoma.
Terry Lineen, 84, New Zealand rugby union player (Auckland, national team).
Mário da Graça Machungo, 79, Mozambican politician, Prime Minister (1986–1994).
Kizito Mihigo, 38, Rwandan gospel singer, organist and peace activist, founder of the Kizito Mihigo Peace Foundation.
Andrzej Popiel, 84, Polish actor.
Charles Portis, 86, American author (True Grit, Norwood, Gringos).
Ampitiye Rahula Maha Thero, 106, Sri Lankan Sinhalese Buddhist monk.
Robert V. Rice, 95, American biochemist.
Giorgi Shengelaia, 82, Georgian film director (Alaverdoba, Melodies of Vera Quarter, The Journey of a Young Composer).
James G. Spady, 75, American writer, historian and journalist.
Vladimír Svitek, 57, Slovak ice hockey player.
Georges Villeneuve, 97, Canadian politician, MP (1953–1958) and mayor of Dolbeau-Mistassini (1961–1968).
Anna-Stina Wahlberg, 88, Swedish Olympic diver (1952, 1956).
Rita Walters, 89, American politician, member of the Los Angeles City Council  (1991–2001).
Andrew Weatherall, 56, English music producer (Screamadelica), DJ and musician (The Sabres of Paradise, Two Lone Swordsmen), pulmonary embolism.
Ror Wolf, 87, German writer and poet.
Mickey Wright, 85, American Hall of Fame golfer, AP Athlete of the Year (1963, 1964), heart attack.
Mustafa Yücedağ, 53, Turkish footballer (Ajax, Galatasaray, national team), heart attack.
Sonja Ziemann, 94, German actress (The Black Forest Girl, The Heath Is Green, The Bridge at Remagen).

18
Ken Joe Ada, 37, Guamanian politician.
Jaime Amat, 78, Spanish Olympic field hockey player (1964, 1972).
Kishori Ballal, 82, Indian actress (Gair Kaanooni, Ek Alag Mausam, Aakramana).
Pranjal Bharali, 60, Indian film producer (Antaheen Jatra, Suren Suror Putek, Junda Iman Gunda).
José Bonaparte, 91, Argentine paleontologist.
Flavio Bucci, 72, Italian actor (Suspiria, Last Stop on the Night Train, Il divo), heart attack.
Jon Christensen, 76, Norwegian jazz drummer (Masqualero).
Colonel Dinar, 33, Chadian comedian, stabbed.
Veselin Đuretić, 86, Serbian historian.
Philippe Forquet, 79, French actor.
Yoshikichi Furui, 82, Japanese author and translator, hepatocellular carcinoma.
Linda P. Johnson, 74, American politician, member of the North Carolina House of Representatives (since 2001), stroke.
Eugeniusz Kabatc, 90, Polish writer and translator.
Peter Montgomery, 72, American mathematician.
Tapas Paul, 61, Indian actor (Dadar Kirti, Bhalobasa Bhalobasa, Mayabini) and politician, MLA (2001–2009) and MP (2009–2019), cardiac arrest.
Bob Petty, 79, American television reporter and news anchor (WLS-TV), lung cancer.
Peregrine Pollen, 89, English auctioneer (Sotheby's).
Jean Schlegel, 94, French Olympic long-distance runner (1952).
Ashraf Sinclair, 40, British-born Malaysian actor (Gol & Gincu The Series), heart attack.
Sreten Stefanović, 103, Serbian Olympic gymnast (1952).
Bert Sutherland, 83, American computer scientist.
Seda Vermisheva, 87, Armenian-Russian poet and economist.

19
Lucien Aimé-Blanc, 84, French police officer.
Pete Babando, 94, Canadian ice hockey player (Detroit Red Wings, Chicago Black Hawks, Boston Bruins), Stanley Cup champion (1950).
P. K. Belliappa, 79, Indian cricketer (Tamil Nadu).
Beatriz Bonnet, 89, Argentine actress, complications from Alzheimer's disease.
Bob Cobert, 95, American composer (The Winds of War, War and Remembrance, The Night Stalker), pneumonia.
Heather Couper, 70, British astronomer and broadcaster, President of the British Astronomical Association (1984–1986).
James Cutsinger, 66, American author and academic.
Bob Daimond, 73, British civil engineer.
Jean Daniel, 99, Algerian-born French journalist, founder of L'Obs.
Wilfred De'Ath, 82, British journalist (The Oldie).
Wilhelm von der Emde, 97, German-Austrian civil engineer.
Gust Graas, 95, Luxembourgian painter and businessman.
Ann Grifalconi, 90, American author and illustrator, complications from dementia.
Hector, 73, French singer.
Thiruvalaputhur T A Kaliyamurthy, 71, Indian musical Thavil artist, heart attack.
Ke Huibing, 41, Chinese professor.
Jos van Kemenade, 82, Dutch politician, Minister of Education and Sciences (1973–1977, 1981–1982), Queen's Commissioner of North Holland (1992–2002).
Inesa Kozlovskaya, 92, Russian physiologist, corresponding member of the Russian Academy of Sciences, and Honored Scientist of the Russian Federation (1996).
Robert H. Lee, 86, Canadian real estate executive, philanthropist and university administrator, chancellor of the University of British Columbia (1993–1996). 
Hubert B. MacNeill, 97, Canadian politician and physician.
Yervand Manaryan, 95, Iranian-born Armenian actor.
K. S. Maniam, 78, Malaysian writer, bile duct cancer.
José Mojica Marins, 83, Brazilian film director ("Coffin Joe", At Midnight I'll Take Your Soul), bronchopneumonia.
Jerry G. Melvin, 90, American politician, member of the Florida House of Representatives (1968–1978).
Lilian Mohin, 81, British feminist publisher (Onlywomen Press).
Fernando Morán, 93, Spanish diplomat, Minister of Foreign Affairs (1982–1985), ambassador to the UN (1985–1987) and MEP (1987–1999).
Germaine Poliakov, 101, Turkish-born French music teacher and Holocaust survivor.
John Robertson, 90, Canadian Olympic sailor (1948, 1952).
Wes Sandle, 84, New Zealand physicist (University of Otago).
Pop Smoke, 20, American rapper ("Welcome to the Party", "Dior"), shot.
Jack Youngerman, 93, American artist, complications from a fall.

20
Mohammed Abaamran, 87, Moroccan actor and singer.
Sadhu Aliyur, 57, Indian watercolor painter.
Mary Rose Barrington, 94, British parapsychologist and barrister.
Peter Louis Cakü, 66, Burmese Roman Catholic prelate, Bishop of Kengtung (since 2001).
Peter Dreher, 87, German painter.
Emmanuel Emovon, 90, Nigerian chemist and academic.
Jeanne Evert, 62, American tennis player, ovarian cancer.
Yona Friedman, 96, Hungarian-born French architect and theorist.
Joanna Frueh, 72, American artist and feminist scholar, breast cancer.
Zoe Gail, 100, South African-born American actress and singer.
István Gáli, 76, Hungarian Olympic boxer (1968).
Gilbert Kaenel, 70, Swiss archaeologist and historian.
Usman Ullah Khan, 45, Pakistani Olympic boxer (1996, 2000), cancer.
Bill Malarkey, 68, Manx politician, MHK (2006–2011, since 2015), cancer.
Glynn Mallory, 81, American lieutenant general.
Joaquim Pina Moura, 67, Portuguese politician and economist, Minister of Economy and Treasury (1997–2001) and MP (1995–2007).
Claudette Nevins, 82, American actress (...All the Marbles, Tuff Turf, Sleeping with the Enemy).
Jean-Claude Pecker, 96, French astronomer, President of the Société astronomique de France (1973–1976) and General Secretary of the International Astronomical Union (1964–1967).
Dan Radakovich, 84, American football coach (Pittsburgh Steelers, Los Angeles Rams).
Ronald B. Scott, 74, American author (Mitt Romney: An Inside Look at the Man and His Politics) and journalist, cancer.
Nicholas Todd Sutton, 58, American serial killer, execution by electrocution.
René Visse, 82, French politician, Deputy (1978–1981).
Elyse Weinberg, 74, Canadian-American singer-songwriter, lung cancer.
Jimmy Wheeler, 86, English football player (Reading) and manager (Bradford City).

21
Shlomo Aronson, 83, Israeli historian and politologist.
A.P. Indy, 31, American racehorse and sire.
Lois Betteridge, 91, Canadian silversmith and goldsmith.
Alan Caiger-Smith, 90, British potter.
Michel Charasse, 78, French politician, Senator (1992–2010).
Camila María Concepción, 28, American screenwriter and transgender rights activist, suicide.
Nick Cuti, 75, American comic book artist (E-Man), cancer.
Du Yulu, 79, Chinese actor (Yongzheng Dynasty), lung cancer.
Sir David Evans, 95, British air chief marshal.
Sir Sydney Giffard, 93, British diplomat and writer, ambassador to Switzerland (1980–1982) and Japan (1984–1986).
Zygmunt Grodner, 88, Polish Olympic fencer (1952).
Hisashi Katsuta, 92, Japanese voice actor (Astro Boy, Astroganger, Groizer X).
Lal Khan, 64, Pakistani Marxist political theorist, cancer.
Sir Andrew Leggatt, 89, British judge, Lord Justice of Appeal (1990–1997).
Boris Leskin, 97, Russian actor (Heavenly Swallows, Vampire's Kiss, Men in Black).
Phil Maloney, 92, Canadian ice hockey player (Boston Bruins, Chicago Blackhawks) and coach (Vancouver Canucks).
Vince Marinello, 82, American sportscaster and convicted murderer.
Lisel Mueller, 96, German-born American poet.
Vera Paunović, 72, Serbian politician.
Ilídio Pinto Leandro, 69, Portuguese Roman Catholic prelate, Bishop of Viseu (2006–2018).
Vangelis Ploios, 82, Greek actor (The Auntie from Chicago, A Hero in His Slippers, The Countess of Corfu).
Tao Porchon-Lynch, 101, American yoga master and author.
Ouida Ramón-Moliner, 90, Irish-born Canadian anaesthetist.
Baju Ban Riyan, 78, Indian politician, MLA (1967–1980), MP (1980–1989, 1996–2014).

22
Krishna Bose, 89, Indian social worker and politician, MP (1996–2004).
James Brown, 68, American painter, traffic collision.
June Dally-Watkins, 92, Australian model and businesswoman.
Kiki Dimoula, 88, Greek poet.
Binoy Dutta, 75, Indian politician, MLA (1996–2011).
Butch Gautreaux, 72, American politician, member of the Louisiana House of Representatives (1996–2000), Louisiana State Senate (2000–2012).
Martin Gouterman, 88, American chemist.
Harber H. Hall, 99, American politician, member of the Illinois House of Representatives (1967–1972), Illinois Senate (1973–1979).
Nobuya Hoshino, 83, Japanese table tennis player.
Jacques Houplain, 99, French painter and engraver.
Mike Hughes, 64, American daredevil and flat Earth conspiracy theorist, rocket crash.
Jeff Kimpel, 77, American meteorologist.
Kazuhiko Kishino, 86, Japanese voice actor (Kinnikuman, Neptuneman, Burst Angel), heart failure.
Maryan Plakhetko, 74, Ukrainian-born Russian footballer (SKA Lviv, CSKA Moscow, Soviet Union national team).
B. Smith, 70, American restaurateur and television host, complications from Alzheimer's disease.
Thích Quảng Độ, 91, Vietnamese Buddhist monk, patriarch of the Unified Buddhist Sangha of Vietnam (since 2008).
Simon Warr, 66, British broadcaster (BBC) and actor (That'll Teach 'Em), pancreatic and liver cancer.
Linda Wolfe, 87, American journalist and author (Wasted: The Preppie Murder).
Rita Wolfensberger, 91, Swiss pianist.
Mark Zanna, 75, Canadian social psychologist.

23
Ahmaud Arbery, 25, American jogger, shot.
Pierre Aubenque, 90, French philosopher.
Hervé Bourges, 86, French journalist and executive (Conseil supérieur de l'audiovisuel, France Télévisions, International Francophone Press Union).
Russ Cochran, 82, American comic book publisher.
Ramón Conde, 85, Puerto Rican baseball player (Chicago White Sox).
Double Trigger, 28, Irish racehorse, Ascot Gold Cup winner (1995), heart attack.
Amr Fahmy, 36, Egyptian football administrator, cancer.
Stefan Florenski, 86, Polish footballer (Górnik Zabrze, GKS Tychy, national team).
Quenby Fung, 54, Hong Kong novelist, cancer.
Norene Gilletz, 79, Canadian kosher cookbook author.
János Göröcs, 80, Hungarian football player (Újpest, Tatabánya, national team) and manager, Olympic bronze medalist (1960).
Zoran Modli, 71, Serbian journalist, radio disc jockey (Modulacije) and aviator.
Helmut Nowak, 82, Polish footballer (Szombierki Bytom, Legia Warsaw, national team).
Seaver Peters, 87, American ice hockey player (Dartmouth College).
Sha Qinglin, 89, Chinese engineer, member of the Chinese Academy of Engineering.
Vince Weber, 66, German blues pianist.
Raymond York, 86, American jockey, pneumonia.
Zhou Tonghui, 95, Chinese analytical chemist, member of the Chinese Academy of Sciences.
Margrit Zimmermann, 93, Swiss pianist and composer.

24
Bob Andelman, 59, American journalist, author and talk show host, cancer.
Andrzej Bryl, 62, Polish taekwondo practitioner.
Mario Bunge, 100, Argentine philosopher of science.
Robert Cabaj, 72, American psychiatrist, scholar and author.
Diana Serra Cary, 101, American actress (The Darling of New York, Captain January, The Family Secret).
Ben Cooper, 86, American actor (Johnny Guitar, Gunfight at Comanche Creek, Rebel in Town). 
István Csukás, 83, Hungarian poet and author.
Clive Cussler, 88, American adventure novelist (Raise the Titanic!, Sahara) and underwater explorer, founder of the NUMA.
Sonny Franzese, 103, Italian-born American mobster (Colombo crime family).
Don Furner, 87, Australian rugby league coach (Eastern Suburbs, Canberra Raiders, national team).
Ernie Gaskin, 86, English greyhound trainer.
Bruce George, 77, British politician, MP (1974–2010), complications from Alzheimer's disease.
Jiang Yiyuan, 92, Chinese agricultural engineer.
Katherine Johnson, 101, American mathematician (NASA).
Ayrat Karimov, 48, Russian footballer (SKA Rostov-on-Don, Torpedo Taganrog, Shakhter Karagandy).
Sung Wan Kim, 79, Korean-born American pharmacologist and bioengineer.
Jan Kowalczyk, 78, Polish show jumper, Olympic champion (1980).
Johan van Loon, 85, Dutch ceramist and textile artist.
John Lang Nichol, 96, Canadian politician.
Roy Norris, 72, American serial killer.
Frank Nowacki, 72, British architect, amyotrophic lateral sclerosis.
Ida Stephens Owens, 80, American scientist.
David Roback, 61, American guitarist (Mazzy Star, Rain Parade, Opal) and songwriter.
Stephan Ross, 88, Polish-born American holocaust survivor, founder of New England Holocaust Memorial.
Vasily Savvin, 80, Russian military officer, commander of the Internal Troops of Russia (1992).
Peter Schimke, 59, American pianist and composer, suicide.
Georg R. Sheets, 72, American historian.
Guillermo Solá, 90, Chilean Olympic runner (1952).
Dick Tamburo, 90, American college athletic director (Arizona State Sun Devils, Missouri Tigers, Texas Tech Red Raiders).
Jahn Teigen, 70, Norwegian musician (Popol Ace).
Olof Thunberg, 94, Swedish actor (Winter Light, Bamse, Amorosa).
Tom Watkins, 70, English music manager (Pet Shop Boys).
Juan Eduardo Zúñiga, 101, Spanish literary scholar and writer.

25
Javier Arias Stella, 95, Peruvian pathologist and politician, Minister of Health (1963–1965, 1967–1968) and of Foreign Affairs (1980–1983), discovered the Arias-Stella reaction.
Susan Beaumont, 83, English film actress.
Lee Phillip Bell, 91, American television producer (The Bold and the Beautiful, The Young and the Restless).
Valerian D'Souza, 86, Indian Roman Catholic prelate, Bishop of Poona (1977–2009).
Claude Flagel, 87, French musician.
Nesby Glasgow, 62, American football player (Indianapolis Colts, Seattle Seahawks), cancer.
Kazuhisa Hashimoto, 61, Japanese video game programmer, creator of the Konami Code.
Naimatullah Khan, 89, Pakistani politician, Mayor of Karachi (2001–2005).
Hikmet Köksal, 88, Turkish military officer, Commander of the Army (1996–1997).
Yuri Kuplyakov, 89, Russian diplomat, Soviet ambassador to Nigeria (1985–1990).
Adam Maher, 47, Australian rugby league player (Cronulla Sharks, Gateshead Thunder, Hull F.C.), amyotrophic lateral sclerosis.
Raymond Martin, 94, Australian chemist and academic administrator, vice-chancellor of Monash University (1977–1987).
Hosni Mubarak, 91, Egyptian military officer and politician, President (1981–2011), Prime Minister (1981–1982) and Vice-President (1975–1981), kidney failure.
Satya Nandan, Fijian diplomat, representative to the United Nations (1970–1976, 1993–1995) and ambassador to the Netherlands (1976–1980).
Bernard Pingaud, 96, French writer.
Peter Pritchard, 76, English turtle zoologist.
Lívia Rusz, 89, Romanian-Hungarian graphic artist.
P. Sankaran, 72, Indian politician, MP (1998–1999) and MLA (2001–2006).
Erico Spinadel, 90, Austrian-Argentine industrial engineer.
Bob Steiner, 73, Canadian football player (Hamilton Tiger-Cats).
George Yankowski, 97, American baseball player (Philadelphia Athletics, Chicago White Sox).
Dmitry Yazov, 95, Russian military officer, Minister of Defence (1987–1991) and Marshal of the Soviet Union.

26
Henry J. Abraham, 98, American scholar and writer.
Donald E. Belfi, 84, American judge.
Bhadreswar Buragohain, 74, Indian politician, MLA (1985–1990), MP (1990–1996).
Sam Boghosian, 88, American football player (UCLA Bruins) and coach (Oregon State Beavers, Los Angeles Raiders).
Eduardo Bort, 72, Spanish guitarist.
Stroma Buttrose, 90, Australian architect and town planner.
Betsy Byars, 91, American author (Summer of the Swans).
Hans Deinzer, 86, German clarinetist.
Sergei Dorensky, 88, Russian pianist.
Muhamed Filipović, 90, Bosnian politician, writer and historian.
Nick Apollo Forte, 81, American musician and actor (Broadway Danny Rose).
Peter Frusetta, 87, American politician.
Isgandar Hamidov, 71, Azerbaijani politician, Minister of Internal Affairs (1992–1993).
Nexhmije Hoxha, 99, Albanian politician, MP (1948–1985) and chairwoman of the Democratic Front (1985–1990).
Rudolf Kassel, 93, German classical philologist.
Michel Leplay, 92, French Protestant pastor.
Lionel D, 61, French radio host and rapper.
Clinton Marius, 53, South African writer and performer.
Michael Medwin, 96, English actor (Shoestring, Scrooge, The Army Game).
Andrea Mugione, 79, Italian Roman Catholic prelate, Bishop of Cassano all'Jonio (1988–1998), Archbishop of Crotone-Santa Severina (1998–2006) and Benevento (2006–2016).
Bijaya Kumar Nayak, 68, Indian politician, MLA (1995–2000).
Terence Penelhum, 90, British-Canadian philosopher.
Bertram Raven, 93, American academic.
Annie Riis, 92, Norwegian writer.
Corky Rogers, 76, American football coach (Robert E. Lee HS, Bolles School).
Carl Slone, 83, American college basketball coach (George Washington Colonials, Richmond Spiders).
David Smith, 78, Canadian politician, MP (1980–1984, 2002–2016).
François Tajan, 57, French auctioneer, food poisoning.
Clementina Vélez, 73, Colombian doctor, academic and politician, MP (1990–1991, 1998–2002) and city councillor of Cali (1972–1986, 1992–1997, 2004–2019), heart attack.
Kostas Voutsas, 88, Greek actor (Law 4000, Alice in the Navy, The Downfall) and writer, lung infection.

27
Eduardo Alas Alfaro, 89, Salvadoran Roman Catholic prelate, Bishop of Chalatenango (1987–2007).
R. D. Call, 70, American actor (Young Guns II, Into the Wild, EZ Streets), complications from back surgery.
David Callister, 84, Manx broadcaster and politician.
Tina Carline, 71–72, New Zealand television weather presenter (TV One), cancer.
Sudhakar Chaturvedi, 122 (claimed), Indian Vedic scholar and courier (Mahatma Gandhi).
Burkhard Driest, 80, German actor (Stroszek, Cross of Iron, Querelle).
Eugene Dynarski, 86, American actor (Close Encounters of the Third Kind).
Irvino English, 42, Jamaican footballer (national team), shot.
Valdir Espinosa, 72, Brazilian football manager (Cerro Porteño, Botafogo, Corinthians), complications from surgery.
Juan Diego González, 39, Colombian footballer (Once Caldas, La Equidad, Philadelphia Union). (body discovered on this date)
Colin S. Gray, 76, British-American geopolitical writer.
Samvel Karapetyan, 58, Armenian historian.
Hadi Khosroshahi, 81, Iranian cleric and diplomat, COVID-19.
Seiji Kurata, 74, Japanese photographer, lung cancer.
Lillian Offitt, 81, American blues and R&B singer.
Gloster Richardson, 77, American football player (Kansas City Chiefs, Dallas Cowboys, Cleveland Browns), Super Bowl Champion (1970, 1971).
K. P. P. Samy, 57, Indian politician, MLA (2006–2011, since 2016).
Sripal Silva, 59, Sri Lankan cricketer, injuries sustained in a traffic collision.
Leroy Suddath, 89, American major general.
Braian Toledo, 26, Argentine javelin thrower, Youth Olympic champion (2010), traffic collision.
Suthep Wongkamhaeng, 85, Thai luk krung singer.
Alki Zei, 94, Greek novelist and children's writer.

28
Johnny Antonelli, 89, American baseball player (Boston/Milwaukee Braves, New York/San Francisco Giants, Cleveland Indians).
Allen Boothroyd, 76, British industrial designer, co-founder of Meridian Audio, prostate cancer.
Kenyel Brown, 40, American serial killer, suicide by gunshot.
Ulambayaryn Byambajav, 35, Mongolian sumo wrestler, world champion (2006, 2007).
Jaime Carbonell, 66, Uruguayan-born American computer scientist.
Janusz Cisek, 65, Polish historian and academic, leukemia.
Joe Coulombe, 89, American entrepreneur (Trader Joe's).
Emmanuel Debarre, 71, French sculptor.
Freeman Dyson, 96, British-born American physicist and mathematician (Dyson's transform, Rank of a partition, Dyson series), fall.
Joyce Gordon, 90, American actress and pitchwoman.
Sir Lenox Hewitt, 102, Australian public servant, Secretary of the Prime Minister's Department (1968–1971), Lewy body dementia.
Muhammad Imara, 88, Egyptian Islamic scholar.
S. Kathavarayan, 58, Indian politician, MLA (since 2019).
Mahmoud Khayami, 90, Iranian industrialist and philanthropist.
Balbir Singh Kullar, 77, Indian field hockey player, Olympic bronze medallist (1968), heart attack.
Gennady Kuzmin, 74, Ukrainian chess player.
Teresa Machado, 50, Portuguese Olympic discus thrower and shot putter (1992, 1996, 2000, 2004).
Craig Mackay, 92, Canadian Olympic speed skater (1948, 1952).
Baidyanath Prasad Mahto, 72, Indian politician, MLA (2000–2009), MP (2009–2014, since 2019).
Stig-Göran Myntti, 94, Finnish football (VPS, VIFK, RU-38) and bandy player.
Phil Prince, 93, American university football player (Clemson Tigers) and academic administrator, President of Clemson University (1994–1995).
John Renton, American geologist.
Carl Schell, 95, Canadian judoka.
Shadakshari Settar, 84, Indian historian and archaeologist, pleural effusion.
Esala Teleni, Fijian rugby player and military officer.

29
Chloe Aaron, 81, American television executive (PBS), cancer and chronic obstructive pulmonary disease.
Gérard Arseguel, 82, French poet.
Avraham Barkai, 99, German-born Israeli historian.
G. P. Mellick Belshaw, 91, American Episcopal prelate, Bishop of New Jersey (1983–1994).
Bill Bunten, 89, American politician, member of the Kansas House of Representatives (1962–1990) and Senate (2002–2004), Mayor of Topeka (2005–2013), pneumonia.
Malcolm Chase, 63, British social historian, brain tumour.
Raymond C. Fisher, 80, American jurist, Judge of the U.S. Court of Appeals for the Ninth Circuit (since 1999), cancer.
Lynn Geesaman, 81, American photographer.
Ian Lyall Grant, 104, British army officer and engineer.
Bella Hammond, 87, American activist and political figure, First Lady of Alaska.
Vito Kapo, 97, Albanian politician, Minister of Industry (1982–1990).
Dieter Laser, 78, German actor (Lexx, The Ogre, The Human Centipede'').
Fiona MacCarthy, 80, English journalist and biographer.
Arnaud Marquesuzaa, 85, French rugby union player (Racing 92, US Montauban).
Eleanor Martin, 69, Australian dancer.
Luis Alfonso Mendoza, 55, Mexican dubbing and voice actor, shot.
Ceri Morgan, 72, Welsh darts player.
Odile Pierre, 87, French organist and composer.
*Mohammad Ali Ramazani Dastak, 56, Iranian military officer and politician, MP (since 2020), influenza.
Herman Redemeijer, 89, Dutch politician, member of the Senate (1987–1995).
Bill Smith, 93, American jazz clarinetist and composer, complications from prostate cancer.
Éva Székely, 92, Hungarian Hall of Fame swimmer, Olympic champion (1952).
Andrei Vedernikov, 60, Russian racing cyclist, world champion (1981).
Gene Waldorf, 84, American politician, member of the Minnesota House of Representatives (1977–1980) and Senate (1981–1993).

References

2020-02
 02